Baby and I is a 2008 South Korean film about a rebellious 18-year-old high school senior who ends up caring for a baby with a note, claiming he is the baby's father.

Plot 
A high school student, Han Joon-soo (Jang Keun-suk), is a troublemaker. He always quarrels with his parents and does not obey them. One day his parents are sick of his bad behavior and run away from home, leaving only a videotape and $100, stating they would come back when Joon-soo got his act together. Shrugging it off, he decides to just throw a small party with his friends, Ki-seok (Ko Gyoo-pil) and Choon-seung (Choi Jae-hwan), in his empty house. While buying alcohol at a grocery store, a baby with a note is left in his cart. The note claims the high school senior, Han Joon-soo, is the father of the baby and the mother could not take care of him anymore. The baby's name is revealed to be Han Woo-ram (Moon Mason). Joon-soo finds himself stuck with the child, he tries abandoning Woo-ram multiple times, but always fails. Without anyone to help him, other than Kim Byul (Song Ha-yoon), a smart girl who has a crush on him, Joon-soo resorts to bringing the baby to school and his part-time jobs. Finally, he is suspended from school due to the baby being a disturbance. After days of becoming financially broke and sinking to the bottom, his parents come back home when Joon-soo has an emotional breakdown and expresses his sympathy and love for the baby; a love that changed him from troublemaker to a caring father. Joon-soo's parents acknowledge their love for their son and tell Joon-soo that they will help take care of Woo-ram. When Woo-ram is admitted to the hospital, Joon-soo becomes depressed and meets up Ki-seok. Ki-seok tells Joon-soo that he himself is the father of Woo-ram.  Furious, Joon-soo beats up Ki-seok and tells him to take Woo-ram back. He later lies to Byul and Choon-seung that he does not care about Woo-ram anymore. Woo-ram, now out of the hospital, is being adopted by a couple from overseas. After contemplating, Joon-soo races to the airport and fights his way through security. At the gate, he yells for the couple to give Woo-ram back to him. Later, Joon-soon agrees with Ki-Seok that they will raise Woo-ram together. Byul sends Ki-seok and Choon-seung to go buy some soda, wanting to be alone with Joon-soo. After she coyly compliments his "cool" behavior at the airport, Byul  gives Joon-soo a quick kiss before running off.

Release 
Baby and I was released on August 10, 2008. The film was directed by Kim Jin-young. The film had an attendance of 435,551 nationwide.

Difference with the manga 
Baby and I is loosely based on the manga. Although the situation is somewhat similar, the film's main character is a troublemaking high school student while the main character in the manga Baby & Me is a model student. In addition to the theme, Han Joon-soo has a problem with his parents and has a baby; in contrast, Takuya Enoki has the ideal family but is taking care of his younger brother in the place of his deceased mother.

Cast 
 Jang Keun-Seok as Han Joon-soo
 Moon Mason as Baby Woo-ram
 Park Myeong-su as Baby Woo-ram (voice) 
 Song Ha-yoon as Kim Byul
 Ko Kyu-pil as Ki-seok
 Choi Jae-hwan as Choon-seong
 Kim Byeong-ok as Joon-soo's father
 Park Hyun-sook as Joon-soo's mother
 Jung Gyu-soo as Kim Byul's father
 Jang Jung-hee as  Kim Byul's mother
 Song Min-hyung as Vice principal
 Kim Jung-nan as Ms. Cho
 Gil Hae-yeon as Ki-seok's mother

References

External links 

  
 
 

2008 films
2008 comedy-drama films
2000s Korean-language films
South Korean comedy-drama films
2000s South Korean films